V de V may refer to:

 V de V (Vêtements de Vacance), a sportswear fashion brand by Michèle Rosier
 V de V Sports, a motor racing organisation owned by Eric Van de Vyver
 V de V Challenge Monoplace, a single-seater racing series

See also
 
 V (disambiguation)
 VV (disambiguation)
 Violadores del Verso, a Spanish rap music crew